Newville is an unincorporated community in Glenn County, California.

A post office operated at Newville from 1868 to 1918.

External links

References

Unincorporated communities in California
Unincorporated communities in Glenn County, California